Theresa Kavita Patil (born in Brooklyn, New York, United States) is an American actress who is known for playing Sergeant Medawar in the television show The Unit. She has also made guest appearances on other television shows including Hawthorne, Dexter and more recently on Scandal and Revenge.

She co-starred in the film Whiplash (2014).

References

External links

American actresses of Indian descent
Living people
Year of birth missing (living people)
21st-century American actresses
American film actresses
American television actresses
Artists from Brooklyn
Actresses from New York City